The Collegiata di Santa Maria della Reggia is a Renaissance-style, Roman Catholic church located in Umbertide, province of Perugia, region of Umbria, Italy. In 2015, it was part of the parish of San Giovanni Battista.

History

The octagonal church is located in the center of town, in Piazza Mazzini, near the Rocca of Umbertide or town castle. The church has a painting depicting San Isidoro by the school of Guido Reni and an 18th-century Assumption of the Virgin. The design and construction of the church was begun in 1559 by Galeazzo Alessi and Giulio Danti; however construction continued until 1640. Other architects involved included Bino Sozi, Mariotto da Cortona (1600) and finally Bernardino Sermigni (1640). The interior is framed by a circle of 16 doric columns.

The interior of the church has a 15th-century Madonna and Child with Saints and Transfiguration (1578) by Niccolo Circignani. The church was built by the town to house a miraculous icon of the Virgin frescoed inside a nearby small chapel.

References

16th-century Roman Catholic church buildings in Italy
Renaissance architecture in Umbria
Roman Catholic churches completed in 1640
Churches in the province of Perugia
Octagonal churches in Italy
1640 establishments in Italy